Royal Air Force Station Gan, commonly known as RAF Gan, is a former Royal Air Force station on Gan island, the southern-most island of Addu Atoll, which is part of the larger groups of islands which form the Maldives, in the middle of the Indian Ocean.  Its motto is En Route, which signifies its importance as a strategic staging post for enabling RAF aircraft to reach their onward destinations at their bases in the Far East.

Following the departure of the Royal Air Force (RAF) in 1976, the former RAF Gan airfield was developed into a civilian airport, and is now known as Gan International Airport.

History
Royal Navy engineers began constructing airstrips on Gan island from crushed coral in August 1941 for the Fleet Air Arm (FAA).

During World War II, in 1942, the Royal Air Force (RAF) had its bases in the islands of Addu Atoll, Maldives.  The RAF first had a presence on Hithadoo in 1942, when a detachment of RAF personnel were sent from RAF China Bay in Ceylon to service and turn around the RAF Short Sunderland and PBY Catalina flying boats that were flying regularly into the Addu Atoll lagoon.  At the end of the war, all military installations were either removed or abandoned.

In 1956–57, at the request of SWRD Bandaranaike, the Royal Air Force handed over its bases in Ceylon to the Royal Ceylon Air Force.  The loss of RAF Negombo meant that a replacement staging post was needed between its bases in the Middle East and Far East, and the location was virtually limited to Gan.  Hence Royal Air Force Station Gan became established in the late 1950s as a stopover on the reinforcement route to the Far East Air Force based in Singapore.  The previous reinforcement route had passed through countries that had formerly been British territory, but were now independent, and sometimes hostile nations.  RAF Mauripur, to the west of Karachi, by then a Pakistan Air Force station, had RAF personnel attached for staging airfield purposes up until 1956, when the staging role between the Middle East and Far East fell to RAF Gan.

It was extensively used as a staging post by bombers, fighters, and transports, on their way to Singapore and other destinations in east Asia during the late 1950s and the 1960s.  Other foreign military forces, like the US, occasionally used the facilities.  However, as the 1970s dawned, the United Kingdom was withdrawing from its commitments east of the Suez.  By the end of 1971, the RAF Far East Air Force was disbanded, and the major rationale for Gan was gone.  Traffic was now much less frequent, but the base still remained open for a few more years.  By 1975, British military aircraft using the base were an extreme rarity.  RAF Gan was thus closed and on 1 April 1976, the entire island with its airfield was handed back to the Maldivian Government.  At the same time as RAF use of the airfield ceased, the RAF gained access to the then newly built airfield  to the south of Gan on the British Indian Ocean Territory (BIOT) island of Diego Garcia.

RAF Gan today
Following the handover back to the Maldivian Government, the island was left to fall into disrepair for many years, but as funds allowed, the airfield was subtly developed into a civil airport, and is now known as Gan International Airport.  Most of the base is now a tourist resort called Equator Village: the former military buildings remain and have been converted into rooms and other facilities on the resort.  The former military hospital is now a dive centre.

See also
RAF Hittadu – communications site for RAF Gan
List of former Royal Air Force stations

References

Citations

Bibliography

External links
Royal Air Force Gan - Remembered
An aircraft crash that 'never happened', by John Cooper
Gan Island is completely different!
RAF Gan - The Far East Air Force
Equator Village, Addu Atoll

Maldives and the Commonwealth of Nations
Military installations established in 1957
Royal Air Force stations in Asia
History of the Maldives
Military installations closed in 1976
United Kingdom and the Commonwealth of Nations